Haramabad (also Romanized as Ḩaramābād; also known as Khorramābād) is a village in Haram Rud-e Olya Rural District, in the Central District of Malayer County, Hamadan Province, Iran. As of the 2006 census, its population was 1,180, in 293 families.

References 

Populated places in Malayer County